Cortinarius salor is a basidiomycete fungus of the genus Cortinarius native to Europe and Asia, spreading as far east as Japan and New Guinea. It is also found in conifer forests of the North American Pacific Northwest.

The mushroom is blue-lilac when young, fading to yellow or tan with age. Similar species include C. anomalus and C. muscigenus.

See also

List of Cortinarius species

References

External links

salor
Fungi of New Guinea
Fungi of Japan
Fungi of Europe
Fungi described in 1838